Khezerchupan (also Romanized as Khez̤erchūpān) is a village in Oryad Rural District, in the Central District of Mahneshan County, Zanjan Province, Iran. At the 2006 census, its population was 279, in 52 families.
A place where no one care about it . It has a dirt road from iron age and authoreties who are selfish ،inefficient، silly and incompetent each year say if god willing in this year we fix and amend you road but it's a bitter sentence.
God damen them
Dod kill them
Especially damen sherini and maleki , fuck both of them

References 

Populated places in Mahneshan County